Forficulidae is a family of earwigs in the order Dermaptera. There are more than 70 genera and 490 described species in Forficulidae.

Species in this family include Forficula auricularia (the European earwig or common earwig) and Apterygida media (the short-winged earwig or hop-garden earwig).

Forficulidae was formerly considered a suborder of Dermaptera, Forficulina, but was reduced in rank to family and placed in suborder Neodermaptera.

Genera
These 71 genera belong to the family Forficulidae:

 Acanthocordax Günther, 1929
 Afrocosmia Hincks, 1960
 Afroforficula Steinmann, 1990
 Allodahlia Verhoeff, 1902
 Ancistrogaster Stal, 1855
 Anechura Scudder, 1876
 Apterygida Westwood, 1840
 Arthroedetus Caudell, 1907
 Brachycosmiella Steinmann, 1990
 Brindleiana Steinmann, 1975
 Chaetocosmia Nishikawa, 1973
 Chamaipites Burr, 1907
 Chelidura Latreille, 1825
 Cipex Burr, 1910
 Cordax Burr, 1910
 Cosmiella Verhoeff, 1902
 Cosmiola Bey-Bienko, 1959
 Diaperasticus Burr, 1907
 Doru Burr, 1907
 Elaunon Burr, 1907
 Eparchus Burr, 1907
 Eudohrnia Burr, 1907
 Eulithinus Hincks, 1935
 Eumegalura Bey-Bienko, 1934
 Eutimomena Bey-Bienko, 1970
 Forcepsia Moreira, 1930
 Forficula Linnaeus, 1758
 Guanchia Burr, 1911
 Hypurgus Burr, 1907
 Kleter Burr, 1907
 Liparura Burr, 1907
 Lipodes Burr, 1907
 Litocosmia Hebard, 1917
 Mesasiobia Semenov, 1908
 Mesolabia Shiraki, 1905
 Metresura Rehn, 1922
 Mixocosmia Borelli, 1909
 Neocosmiella Hebard, 1919
 Neolobophora Scudder, 1875
 Neoopisthocosmia Steinmann, 1990
 Neopterygida Srivastava, 1984
 Obelura Burr, 1907
 Opisthocosmia Dohrn, 1865
 Oreasiobia Semenov, 1936
 Osteulcus Burr, 1907
 Paracosmia Borelli, 1909
 Paracosmiella Steinmann, 1990
 Parasondax Srivastava, 1978
 Parasyntonus Steinmann, 1990
 Paratimomenus Steinmann, 1974
 Pareparchus Burr, 1911
 Parlax Burr, 1911
 Perirrhytus Burr, 1911
 Praos Burr, 1907
 Proforficula Steinmann, 1990
 Prosadiya Hebard, 1923
 Pseudochelidura Verhoeff, 1902
 Pterygida Verhoeff, 1902
 Sarcinatrix Rehn, 1903
 Setocordax Brindle, 1970
 Skalistes Burr, 1907
 Sondax Burr, 1910
 Spinosocordax Steinmann, 1988
 Syntonus Burr, 1910
 Timomenus Burr, 1907
 Tristanella Borelli, 1909
 † Apanechura Zhang, 1989
 † Forficulites Statz, 1939
 † Hadanechura Zhang Junfeng, Sun Bo & Zhang Xiyu, 1994
 † Rupiforficula Engel & Chatzimanolis, 2010
 † Tauropygia Brindle, 1970

References

Further reading

External links

 

 
Earwigs
Dermaptera families
Taxa named by Pierre André Latreille